Suzanne Jackson may refer to:

 Suzanne Jackson (blogger), Irish blogger and writer 
 Suzanne Jackson (artist) (born 1944), American visual artist and gallery owner